Kolah Kabud-e Sofla (also Romanized as Kolāh Kabūd-e Soflá; also known as Kalā Kabūd-e Pā'īn) is a village in Miyan Darband Rural District, in the Central District of Kermanshah County, Kermanshah Province, Iran. At the 2006 census, its population was 122, in 29 families.

References 

Populated places in Kermanshah County